Rachel Rogers (born 16 June 1975) is a Fijian hurdler. She competed in the women's 100 metres hurdles at the 1996 Summer Olympics.

References

External links
 

1975 births
Living people
Athletes (track and field) at the 1996 Summer Olympics
Fijian female hurdlers
Olympic athletes of Fiji
Athletes (track and field) at the 1998 Commonwealth Games
Commonwealth Games competitors for Fiji
Place of birth missing (living people)